"Otherwise Engaged" is a 1965 Australian television film which aired on ABC. Broadcast in a 60-minute time-slot, it was written by John Cameron and produced in Melbourne.

It was part of Wednesday Theatre.The story was similar to A Private Island.

Plot
As a result of pressures of running a large business, Henry Williamson finds he has been neglecting his duties to his family, providing unlimited funds instead of a husband and father's guiding hand. His son is lazy and fails his uni exams, his daughter Pamela is spoilt and is about to be married to a troublesome man called Bevin, and his wife Dorothy spends time making metal sculptures.

In an attempt to have a better family relationship, he takes them - and an employee, Tom - up in a plane to look at a country property he is thinking of buying and winds up on a Pacific island. Williamson insists his family stay there.

Cast
Michael Duffield  as Henry Williamson
Mary Ward as Dorothy
Anne Charleston as his daughter Pamela
Dennis Miller as Tom
Jeffrey Hodgson as Buck
Lloyd Cunnington as the pilot

Production
The play was written exclusively for television. It was the third TV play by John Cameron, who had also written Outpost and The Teeth of Wind. It was described as "a play without a message" and was shot in Melbourne.

Cameron said in writing the play "I set out purely to entertain a television audience. This is a play written for television - it's not an adaptation of a stage play so the plot develops visually. It's one of those plays where you sit back and, I hope, enjoy it."

Reception
The TV critic from the Sydney Morning Herald said "the play might have seemed more attractive in its corrective escapism if some of its palm-fringed, moon-visited settings had not been stirred so obviously by a studio breeze; and Oscar Whitbrcad's direction would have released more of the author's latent humour if his cast had been able to supply more than conventionally stiff realisations of conventional characters."

See also
 List of live television plays broadcast on Australian Broadcasting Corporation (1950s)

References

External links
 
 Otherwise Engaged at Austlit

1965 television plays
1965 Australian television episodes
1960s Australian television plays
Black-and-white television episodes
Wednesday Theatre (season 1) episodes